Isabel Diana Colegate  (10 September 1931 – 12 March 2023) was a British author and literary agent.

Early life and education
Born in Lincolnshire, England, Colegate was the youngest of her parents' four daughters. Her father was Sir Arthur Colegate, while her mother was Winifred Mary, a daughter of Sir William Worsley, 3rd Baronet, and the widow of Captain Francis Percy Campbell Pemberton of the 2nd Life Guards, who had been killed in action in the First World War. 

Colegate was a first cousin of Katharine, Duchess of Kent, who is also a granddaughter of Sir William Worsley, 3rd Baronet.

She was educated at Runton Hill School in Norfolk.

Career
In 1952, Colegate, in partnership with Anthony Blond, set up the publishing firm, Anthony Blond (London) Ltd.

Colegate's novel The Shooting Party (1980) was adapted as an award-winning film of the same name, released in 1985 by Castle Hill Productions Inc. In 2010, the novel was adapted for radio by the BBC.

Marriage and children
In 1953, Colegate married Michael Fenwick Briggs.  The couple had two sons, Barnaby and Joshua, and a daughter, Emily. From 1961 to 2007, they lived at Midford Castle near Bath.

Death
Colegate died on 12 March 2023, at the age of 91.

Awards and honours
 WH Smith Literary Award for The Shooting Party, 1981
 Fellow of the Royal Society of Literature (FRSL), 1981
 Honorary MA, University of Bath, 1988

Bibliography
 The Blackmailer, 1958
 A Man of Power, 1960
 The Great Occasion, 1962
 Statues in a Garden, 1964
 Orlando King, 1968
 Orlando at the Brazen Threshold, 1971
 Agatha, 1973
 News from the City of the Sun, 1979
 The Shooting Party, 1980
 A Glimpse of Sion’s Glory, 1985
 Deceits of Time, 1988
 The Summer of the Royal Visit, 1991
 Winter Journey, 1995
 A Pelican in the Wilderness: Hermits, Solitaries, and Recluses, 2002

References

 Elizabeth Sleeman, International Who's Who of Women, 2002.

External links
 "ISABEL COLEGATE, 1931 –", University of South Carolina.
 "The Shooting Party, 1985", IMDB.
 

1931 births
2023 deaths
20th-century English women writers
20th-century English writers
21st-century English women writers
Fellows of the Royal Society of Literature
Literary agents
Worsley family
Writers from Lincolnshire